Hugh Walter Kelsey (1926 – 18 March 1995) was a British bridge player and writer, best known for advanced books on the play of the cards.

Life 

Kelsey was born and died in Edinburgh. He was a combatant in World War II, and subsequently lived for a long time in Malaya. Before he turned to writing about bridge, he was the author of two detective novels.

Kelsey was a resident of Edinburgh when he died there on 18 March 1995, presumably from "repeated cardiac problems", in the words of Alan Truscott, citing his son George. He was survived by his wife Flora, two sons, and two daughters.

Bridge career 

He won the Gold Cup, the most prestigious British competition, twice, in 1969 and 1980. He represented Scotland twelve times in the Camrose Trophy, played between the constituent countries of the British Isles. He was the non-playing captain of the Great Britain women's team in the 7th World Team Olympiad held at Seattle in 1984.

However, he was most famous and will be remembered as a writer. He wrote some fifty books on the game, mostly aimed at intermediate to advanced players. It is a measure of their quality that many of them were still in print more than a decade after his death. Two of his books, Killing Defence at Bridge and Advanced Play at Bridge, were listed by the Official Encyclopedia of Bridge as "mandatory requirements for a modern technical bridge library". Adventures in Card Play by Kelsey and Géza Ottlik (Gollancz, 1979) is regarded by many as the most advanced book on the play of the cards. It introduced and developed many new concepts such as backwash squeeze and entry-shifting squeeze. Bridge experts surveyed by the American Contract Bridge League (ACBL) in 2007 ranked it third on a list of their favourite books, nearly thirty years after its first publication. 

Kelsey was bridge columnist for the Edinburgh newspaper The Scotsman, wrote many articles for bridge magazines, and was general editor for the Gollancz Master Bridge series. He was the International Bridge Press Association  Personality of the Year in 1993.

The Scottish Bridge Union holds an annual Hugh Kelsey Tournament. This is open to all those in Scotland who are currently receiving lessons.

Publications 
Bridge
 Killing Defence at Bridge (Faber & Faber, 1966); first US ed., Hart, 1967 
 Advanced Play at Bridge (Faber, 1968)
 More Killing Defence at Bridge (Faber, 1972) 
 How to Improve Your Bridge (1973)
 Slam Bidding (1973)
 Match-Point Bridge (1976)
 Logical Bridge Play (Faber, 1976)
 Learn Bridge for Fun (1976)
 Adventures In Card Play, Kelsey and Géza Ottlik (Victor Gollancz Ltd, 1979) – "in association with Peter Crawley", 285 pages 
 Winning Card Play (1979)
 The Tough Game (1979)
 Bridge Odds for Practical Players (1980), with Michael Glauert 
 Bridge: The Mind of the Expert (Faber, 1981)
 Sharpen Your Bridge Technique: How to think like an expert (Faber, 1981)
 Improve Your Opening Leads (1982), with John Matheson
 Deceptive Plays in Bridge (1982)
 The Needle Match (Faber, 1982)
 Simple Squeezes: Kelsey on squeeze play (Gollancz/Crawley, 1985) 
 Bridge Wizardry (1986)
 Bridge for the Connoisseur (Gollancz/Crawley, 1991) 
 New Instant Guide To Bridge (1993)
 Acol Bridge for Bright Beginners (1995)
 Kelsey on Squeeze Play (2002) – compilation of Simple Squeezes (1985), Strip Squeezes, Double Squeezes, and Triple Squeezes

Novels
 A Bullet for Charles (1955), as by Hugh Walter, his given names
 Please Don't Squeeze the Trees (1964)

Notes

References 

 The Official Encyclopedia of Bridge, 5th edition. 1994. 
 Peter Hasenson, British Bridge Almanack, 77 Publishing, 2004, pp198-199.

External links 
 
 Profile by Harold Schogger
 Profile on Eurobridge site
 

1926 births
1995 deaths
British and Irish contract bridge players
Scottish contract bridge players
Contract bridge writers
Date of birth missing
Sportspeople from Edinburgh